Benjamin Rush House, also known as Chesteridge, is a historic home located in West Whiteland Township, Chester County, Pennsylvania. It was built in 1908 as a summer home for an insurance company president named Benjamin Rush. It is a -story, six-bay dwelling built of green serpentine stone and fieldstone in the Georgian Revival style.  It has a -story service wing and a 2-story library wing, added in 1928.

It was listed on the National Register of Historic Places in 1984.

References

Houses on the National Register of Historic Places in Pennsylvania
Georgian Revival architecture in Pennsylvania
Houses completed in 1908
Houses in Chester County, Pennsylvania
National Register of Historic Places in Chester County, Pennsylvania
1908 establishments in Pennsylvania